Altes Haus is German for "old house" and may refer to:

Old House of Lüneburg, a noble family
Burgstall Altes Haus, Pommersbrunn, Bavaria
Hřídelík, a castle in the Czech Republic
Altes Haus (Hotel Geiger), Bavaria
Dat ole Huus, a museum in Wilsede, Lower Saxony
Dat ole Hus, a museum in Aukrug, Schleswig-Holstein